Sangha is a department of the Republic of the Congo in the northern part of the country. It borders the departments of Cuvette, Cuvette-Ouest, and Likouala, and internationally, Cameroon, Gabon and the Central African Republic. The regional capital is Ouésso.  Principal towns include Sembé and Souanké.

Administrative divisions 
Sangha Department is divided into one commune and six districts:

Districts 
 Mokéko District
 Sembé District
 Souanké District
 Pikounda District
 N'gbala District
 Kabo District

Communes 
 Ouésso Commune

References

External links 
The region's nature reserve system
The difficult fight against HIV in Sangha
Ecological survey of the region
Historical review of the area's concession companies

 
Departments of the Republic of the Congo